Chitinase-3-like protein 1 (CHI3L1), also known as YKL-40, is a secreted glycoprotein that is approximately 40kDa in size that in humans is encoded by the CHI3L1 gene. The name YKL-40 is derived from the three N-terminal amino acids present on the secreted form and its molecular mass. YKL-40 is expressed and secreted by various cell-types including macrophages, chondrocytes, fibroblast-like synovial cells, vascular smooth muscle cells, and hepatic stellate cells. The biological function of YKL-40 is unclear. It is not known to have a specific receptor. Its pattern of expression is associated with pathogenic processes related to inflammation, extracellular tissue remodeling, fibrosis and solid carcinomas and asthma.

Function 

Chitinases catalyze the hydrolysis of chitin, which is an abundant glycopolymer found in insect exoskeletons and fungal cell walls. The glycoside hydrolase 18 family of chitinases includes eight human family members. This gene encodes a glycoprotein member of the glycosyl hydrolase 18 family. The protein lacks chitinase activity and is secreted by activated macrophages, chondrocytes, neutrophils and synovial cells. The protein is thought to play a role in the process of inflammation and tissue remodeling. YKL-40 lacks chitinase activity due to mutations within the active site (conserved sequence: DXXDXDXE; YKL-40 sequence: DGLDLAWL).

Regulation and mechanism 

YKL-40 has been linked to activation of the AKT pro-survival (anti-apoptotic) signaling pathway. YKL-40 promotes angiogenesis through VEGF-dependent and independent pathways.

YKL-40 is a migration factor for primary astrocytes and its expression is controlled by NFI-X3, STAT3, and AP-1.

CHI3l1 is induced by a variety of cancers and in the presence of semaphorin 7A (protein) can inhibit multiple anti-tumor immune system responses. Activating an antiviral immune pathway known as the RIG-like helicase (RLH) has the ability to counter CHI3l1 induction. Cancer cells can offset RLH by stimulating NLRX1. Poly(I:C), an RNA-like molecule, can stimulate RLH activation. RLH activation can also inhibit the expression of receptor IL-13Rα2 and pulmonary metastasis. It stores NK cell accumulation and activation. It augments the expression of IFN-α/β, chemerin and its receptor ChemR23, p-cofilin, LIMK2 and PTEN and inhibiting BRAF and NLRX1 in a MAVS-dependent manner.

Cancer 

It is assumed that YKL-40 plays a role in cancer cell proliferation, survival, invasiveness and in the regulation of cell-matrix interactions. It is suggested that YKL-40 is a marker associated with a poorer clinical outcome in genetically defined subgroups of different tumors. YKL-40 was recently introduced into (restricted) clinical practice. A few techniques are available for its detection.

YKL-40 is a Th2 promoting cytokine that is present at high levels in the tumor microenvironment and in the serum of cancer patients. Elevated levels of YKL-40 correlate strongly with stage and outcome of various types of cancer, which establish YKL-40 as a biomarker of disease severity. Targeting YKL-40 with neutralizing antibodies is effective as a treatment in animal models of glioblastoma multiforme.

YKL-40 also enhances tumor survival in response to gamma-irradiation.

Alzheimer's disease and neurodegeneration 
As Alzheimer's disease progresses, soluble amyloid beta aggregates in the brain can induce the activation of microglia, which triggers synthesis of pro-inflammatory mediators. This leads to increased Chi3l1 expression in astrocytes. There is evidence that YKL-40 levels are elevated in Alzheimer's patients compared to cognitively normal individuals. Elevated levels of YKL-40 mRNA were found in Alzheimer's-inflicted brains in comparison with normal controls. Additionally, YKL-40 is correlated other dementia biomarkers, such as tau proteins and amyloid beta. YKL-40 is being examined as a novel Alzheimer's biomarker quantified in the cerebrospinal fluid or blood.

In Huntington's disease YKL-40 has an increasing trend in cerebrospinal fluid in the later disease stages and correlates highly with symptom severity.

References

External links

Further reading 

 
 
 
 
 
 
 
 
 
 
 
 
 
 
 
 
 

Glycoproteins